Holorchis is a genus of trematodes in the family Aephnidiogenidae.

Species
Holorchis castex Bray & Justine, 2007
Holorchis gigas Bray & Cribb, 2007
Holorchis legendrei Dollfus, 1946
Holorchis micracanthum (Stossich, 1889) Orecchia & Paggi, 1974
Holorchis plectorhynchi Durio & Manter, 1968
Holorchis pycnoporus Stossich, 1901

References

Aephnidiogenidae
Trematode genera